Kristian Geelmuyden (12 November 1875 in Kristiania – 18 August 1969) was a Norwegian politician for the Conservative Party.

He served as mayor of Bærum from 1935 to 1937, having previously served as a member of the municipal council since 1929.

Outside politics he spent much of his professional career in Norsk Hydro. He worked as an engineer in Notodden from 1904 to 1915, then as a chief of department and director in Oslo from 1915 to 1926.

Geelmuyden was a reserve officer in the Norwegian Army, with the rank of First Lieutenant.

References

1875 births
1969 deaths
Norwegian Army personnel
Conservative Party (Norway) politicians
Mayors of places in Akershus
Bærum politicians
Norwegian businesspeople